Ronen Feigenbaum (born 2 April 1975) is a former Israeli footballer. He is the son of Yehoshua Feigenbaum.

References

External links

1975 births
Living people
Israeli Jews
Israeli footballers
Hapoel Tel Aviv F.C. players
Bnei Yehuda Tel Aviv F.C. players
Maccabi Herzliya F.C. players
Hapoel Tzafririm Holon F.C. players
Hapoel Jerusalem F.C. players
Hapoel Nof HaGalil F.C. players
Maccabi Ahi Nazareth F.C. players
Hapoel Bnei Lod F.C. players
Maccabi Ironi Kiryat Ata F.C. players
Israeli people of Austrian-Jewish descent
Association football defenders
Big Brother (franchise) contestants